Michael Kyle Williams (born September 23, 1998), known professionally as Sheff G, is an American rapper from Flatbush, Brooklyn, New York. He rose to fame with his single "No Suburban" in 2017 which was a response to the song "Suburban" by 22Gz. Williams is widely known as one of the vanguards of the Brooklyn drill movement.

Early life 
Michael Williams was born on September 23, 1998 in Brooklyn, New York to a Trinidadian mother and Haitian father. He was raised in the Flatbush section of Brooklyn. He was influenced and inspired to rap by listening to B.I.G. and Chicago drill rappers like Lil Bibby and Chief Keef.

Before getting into music, Sheff G joined the 83 (Eight Trey) Gangsta Crips at age 12, and was imprisoned for 2 years for a felony gun charge. In 2015, he went back to prison for robbery for two years. Williams was released from prison in 2017. When asked about his childhood before rap, Williams said: "Growing up, all I was around was violence, in school, or hanging with my niggas, it was rough in the streets. I had to be protected out there, so I rolled with the 83s, we was in Flatbush especially on my block, I was a block baby you heard like niggas kno my body. I would never think rapping would be n my future. I remember in 2014, at 15, we  growing up watching GS9 the G-Stone Crips get big, and they from the 90s on the East side, and I would be like 'damn, imagine I'm like that.' But it was a dream then."

Music career 
Williams was influenced by Chicago Drill rappers Chief Keef, Lil Bibby and G Herbo. In 2017, his single "No Suburban (produced by AXL Beats)" went viral and he was credited as one of the pioneers of the Brooklyn drill music movement. He made a remix of "No Suburban" with GS9 affiliate rapper Corey Finesse.

Sheff G, Sleepy Hallow and Corey Finesse were previously managed by former NFL football player, Junior Galette’s NuLa Entertainment.

In 2019, he released his mixtape called The Unluccy Luccy Kid. His label Winners Circle Entertainment was founded in the same year.

In May 2020, he released his debut studio album called One and Only. His single "No Suburban, Pt. 2" went viral with over 21 million streams. It was later certified Gold by RIAA in 2022.

In August 2020, Winners Circle Entertainment began a partnership with RCA Records. Sheff G and Sleepy Hallow released the single "Tip Toe" produced by Great John, using a sample of Tiny Tim's version of "Tiptoe Through the Tulips". It was the second Sheff G single to be certified Gold by RIAA.

On December 16, 2020, he released the mixtape Proud Of Me Now. Throughout 2021, a multitude of singles would release including "On Go" featuring Polo G in July and "Run It Up" featuring Sleepy Hallow and A Boogie Wit da Hoodie in August.

Legal controversy 
In high school, Williams was arrested and went on probation after firing gunshots at Brooklyn’s Kings Plaza.
One week before he turned 16, in 2014, he was arrested for the first time and booked in for fighting.

On November 19, 2015, Williams was incarcerated for one year and four months in jail for a felony gun charge and robbery. Williams also stated the last time he was incarcerated was in October 2017 to January 2018, a brief stint which he explains was the reason for his break on music.

On July 15, 2021, Williams was arrested in New York City, New York for second-degree gun possession. His bail was remanded, meaning he sat behind bars until his court hearing on August 18, 2021. He pleaded guilty on October 20, 2021, and was sentenced to two years in prison. He is currently serving his sentence at Bare Hill Correctional Facility.

References 

1998 births
Living people
African-American male rappers
East Coast hip hop musicians
Rappers from New York City
Rappers from Brooklyn
Rappers from New York (state)
Drill musicians
Gangsta rappers
Crips
21st-century African-American people